Robert Cooper Grier (March 5, 1794 – September 25, 1870) was an American jurist who served on the Supreme Court of the United States. 

A Jacksonian Democrat from Pennsylvania who served from 1846 to 1870, Grier weighed in on some of the most important cases of the 19th century. As one of two Northern members of the majority in the Dred Scott v. Sandford (1857) decision, Grier concurred that African Americans were not and were never meant to be citizens of the United States and that the property rights of slaveholders were clearly protected in the US Constitution, after being pressured by President-elect James Buchanan to join the Southern majority in an attempt to prevent the appearance that the decision was made along sectional lines. In 1863, Grier wrote the majority opinion in the Prize Cases upholding Abraham Lincoln's presidential power to institute Union blockades of Confederate ports and giving the Union Army a strategic advantage in the American Civil War.

Early life, education, and career
Grier was born in Cumberland County, Pennsylvania to Elizabeth Cooper Grier and Isaac Grier, a Presbyterian minister and School teacher, who tutored him until he entered Dickinson College.  Grier graduated from Dickinson in only one year, receiving a B.A. in 1812, and remained there as an instructor until taking a position at a school his father ran.  He succeeded his father as headmaster in 1815.

While a teacher, Grier read law on his own time, and passed the bar in 1817, at which time he entered private practice in Bloomsburg, Pennsylvania until 1818, and then in Danville, Pennsylvania until 1833. Grier married Isabelle Rose, the daughter of a wealthy Scottish immigrant, in 1829.

Grier was a political organizer for the Jacksonians in the  Democrats. In 1833 Grier was rewarded with a patronage appointment to a judgeship on the Pennsylvania State District Court for Allegheny County, newly created for him.  He served there for 13 years, developing a reputation for competence.

In 1848, Grier was elected as a member to the American Philosophical Society.

Supreme Court justice

Nomination and swearing in
Associate justice of the United States Supreme Court Henry Baldwin died in April 1844, during the presidency of John Tyler. Twice Tyler attempted to fill the vacancy, nominating first Edward King and then John M. Read – both were rejected by the United States Senate. As a result, the seat was still vacant when James K. Polk became president in March 1845. Polk's first nominee for the seat, George Washington Woodward, was also rejected. On August 3, 1846, Polk nominated Grier, whom the Senate unanimously confirmed the following day. He was sworn into office on August 10, 1846. There had been an  gap between the death of Henry Baldwin (April 21, 1844) and Robert Grier's swearing-in, which is the longest vacancy in the history of the U.S. Supreme Court.

Economic cases
Grier's most significant contributions to the Supreme Court and the Constitution are found in his decisions regarding slavery, particularly Dred Scott v. Sandford, and his support of the Union in the Prize Cases.   

In Cook v. Moffat (1847), William G. Cook of Maryland filed bankruptcy in his home state. He believed that, because he had made this decision under Maryland's insolvency laws, he escaped from all debts, including those that he owed to citizens and companies in other states. John L. Moffat and Joseph Curtis, the respondents in this case, thought otherwise. As citizens of New York, Moffat and Curtis argued that Maryland's bankruptcy laws did not free Cook from his obligations in other states. In his first majority opinion, Grier ruled in favor of Moffat and Curtis, finding that a State shall not "inflict her bankrupt laws on contracts and persons not within her limits."  Perhaps more important than what Grier ruled in the case was how he ruled. Citing multiple opinions, Grier remarked that holding in favor of Cook would "overrule every case heretofore decided on this most difficult and intricate subject." To "depart from the safe maxim of stare decisis," said Grier, would be a grave mistake. Grier's respect for the Court's previous rulings constitutes an essential component of his first major opinion.

Grier authored another decisive majority opinion on the question of contracts in Richmond, Fredericksburg, and Potomac Railroad Company v. Louisa Railroad Company (1852). This case revolved around an 1834 charter issued by Virginia to the Richmond, Fredericksburg, and Potomac Railroad Company ("RFP"). The charter granted the RFP sole rights to transport passengers between Richmond and Fredericksburg for a period of thirty years, establishing a contract between the company and the state. Nonetheless, Virginia approved a charter to establish the Louisa Railroad Company ("LRC") in 1848. The LRC, which proposed to carry only freight, followed a route similar to that of the RFP. Feeling that its contract had been violated, the RFP filed suit. In a ruling that pays homage to Taney's Charles River Bridge (1837) opinion, Grier concentrated on strict construction of the charter: "Where do we find that the legislature have contracted to part with the power of constructing other railroads," Grier asked, "even between Richmond and Fredericksburg, for carrying coal or other freight?" Plainly answering himself, Grier explained that "such a contract cannot be elicited from the letter or spirit of this act," thus ruling in favor of the LRC. His decision clearly echoed Taney's call for economic progress and promotion of the public good in the Charles River Bridge decision that to deny the Louisa Railroad's rights would be a disservice to the people and businesses of Virginia.

Conduct investigation
In 1854, the United States House of Representatives' Judiciary Committee conducted an investigation of Grier's conduct in connection with a case then pending before the United States Supreme Court, Pennsylvania v. Wheeling and Belmont Bridge Company. Allegations were that Grier solicited a bribe in order to rule in favor of one of the parties, ignored the law in making his ruling, and leaked the Court's decision early in order to favor one of the parties (who was considering dismissal of the case). Ultimately, the House Judiciary Committee issued a report dismissing the allegations leveled against Grier, stating that Grier "is entirely and absolutely exonerated and freed from the charges preferred against him.  There is absolutely nothing which can or will impair his reputation as a judge or an upright and honest man."  Nonetheless, the Committee's report is intriguing because it was authored by Hendrick B. Wright, who was a fellow Dickinson alumnus and defeated for reelection in the next Congress, indications of probable bias in the justice's favor. Thus, it is unclear whether Grier was guilty of the allegations leveled against him.

Slavery cases
Slavery was the most important political and constitutional issue to come before the Court. In United States v. Hanway (1851), a Third Circuit Court case, Grier dealt with the Fugitive Slave Law of 1850. Though Grier ultimately did not convict Castner Hanway of treason for his role as a bystander when a mob of African Americans killed a slave owner and a federal marshal attempting to recover fugitive slaves, Grier uttered harsh words against abolitionists, describing them as "infuriated fanatics and unprincipled demagogues" who "denounce the constitution, the laws, and the Bible." The justice also carried this philosophy outside the courtroom. When a Presbyterian preacher announced an upcoming abolitionist meeting during Sunday morning service, Grier stood to protest the message, declaring that all good Christians must reject the abolitionist cause. Grier soon reaffirmed these thoughts in his majority opinion in Moore v. Illinois (1852), upholding an Illinois law that punished any citizen who hid runaway slaves. Certainly, Grier's mind throbbed with these beliefs about abolitionists and African American freedom when Dred Scott came before the Supreme Court.

In 1857, Grier was one of two Northerners to side with the majority in the controversial Dred Scott decision. Dred Scott, an African American from Missouri, claimed his freedom based on the premise that he had resided in the Missouri Compromise-established free territory of Wisconsin (present-day Minnesota) with his master, army surgeon Dr. John Emerson. Upon Dr. Emerson's death in 1843, his wife Irene Emerson inherited ownership of Dred Scott. Four years later, Scott sued Mrs. Emerson for his freedom, and a local court ruled in his favor. The Missouri Supreme Court, however, repealed the lower court's decision, reversing over two decades of precedent. After this decision, Scott's ownership transferred to Irene Emerson's brother, John Sandford. Scott then sued Sandford for his freedom. By suing Sandford, a citizen of New York, Scott enabled the Supreme Court to become involved, as this constituted a suit between people of different states.

In a separate opinion, Grier concurred in full with the majority opinion delivered by Chief Justice Roger B. Taney. Taney stated that, based on the language of the Constitution and the founders' feelings toward African Americans, the Court did not consider Dred Scott to be an American citizen, thus restricting his right to sue in federal court. For practical purposes, Taney could have ended his opinion at this point. He pushed further, though, invalidating the Missouri Compromise under which Scott declared his freedom. Justice Grier initially discouraged such a broad ruling, claiming that the Court should restrict itself after ruling on Scott's status as a non-citizen. Wanting to change his peer's mind, Justice John Catron wrote to President-elect James Buchanan and asked him to lobby Grier for a broader opinion. Buchanan happily agreed, and he exchanged a series of letters with Grier, persuading the justice.  In his separate opinion, Justice Grier wrote that he "concurr[ed] with the opinion of the court as delivered by the Chief Justice that the act of Congress of 6th March, 1820 [the Missouri Compromise], is unconstitutional and void and that, assuming the facts as stated in the opinion, the plaintiff cannot sue as a citizen of Missouri in the courts of the United States."  Breaching separation of powers and siding with the majority, the Dred Scott case struck a blow to Justice Grier's historical reputation.

Grier leaked the decision of the "Dred Scott" case early to President-elect James Buchanan. In his inaugural address Buchanan declared that the issue of slavery in the territories would be "speedily and finally settled" by the Supreme Court.  According to historian Paul Finkelman: Buchanan already knew what the Court was going to decide. In a major breach of Court etiquette, Justice Grier, who, like Buchanan, was from Pennsylvania, had kept the President-elect fully informed about the progress of the case and the internal debates within the Court. When Buchanan urged the nation to support the decision, he already knew what Taney would say. Republican suspicions of impropriety turned out to be fully justified.

American Civil War
During the American Civil War, Grier discontinued circuit riding in 1862, and in 1863 wrote the opinion on the Prize Cases, which declared Lincoln's blockade of Southern ports constitutional. In the moments leading up to the Civil War, President Lincoln refused to ask Congress to officially declare war. Doing so, Lincoln believed, would recognize the Confederate States of America as an independent nation and imply the dissolution of the Union. As Commander in Chief, Lincoln acted as if war had been declared, though, issuing blockades of Southern ports that helped to cripple the Southern cause. Opponents of Lincoln's maneuvers saw the blockades as pure piracy since there had been no official call for war. Supporters argued for war in fact, not in words, and justified the blockading and capturing of Southern vessels.

Grier was a strong supporter of the Union. In his majority opinion, Grier supported Lincoln. "A civil war is never solemnly declared," he wrote. "It becomes such by its accidents – the number, power, and organization of the persons who originate and carry it on." Though Congress did not proclaim a state of war existed, thought Grier, "its actual existence is a fact in our domestic history which the Court is bound to notice and to know." Thus, by citing the power that the Constitution confers on the president to use the military to protect the Union, Grier upheld Lincoln's tactics.

Family

Grier married his wife, Isabelle Rose, in 1829, and they had five daughters and one son. His son, U.S. Army doctor William Potter Grier (1834-66) died in a steamship explosion.

Death and legacy
Despite three strokes in 1867, Grier served on the court until 1870, at which point he was quite frail and drastically limited his participation on the court. Grier retired only after his colleagues pressed him to do so, ending his judicial service on January 31, 1870. He died less than a year later at his home, in Philadelphia. He is buried in West Laurel Hill Cemetery, Bala Cynwyd, Pennsylvania.

See also
List of justices of the Supreme Court of the United States

References

Citations

Sources
 Data drawn in part from Oyez, and also the Supreme Court Historical Society

Cited works

Further reading
 Chicago-Kent College of Law at Illinois Tech. "Robert C. Grier." Oyez . Accessed November 8, 2015. https://www.oyez.org/justices/robert_c_grier. 

 Finkelman, Paul. "Scott v. Sandford: The Court's most dreadful case and how it changed history." Chicago-Kent Law Review 82 (2007): 3-48 online.
 Gatell, Frank Otto, "Robert C. Grier," in Leon Friedman and Fred L. Israel, eds. The Justices of the United States Supreme Court: Their Lives and Major Opinions. Volume: 2 (1997) pp 435–45.

 Hall, Kermit L., James W. Ely, Jr., and Joel B. Grossman, eds. "Grier, Robert Cooper." In The Oxford Companion to the Supreme Court of the United States. 2nd ed. 405 – 406. New York: Oxford University Press, 2001. 
 Huebner, Timothy S. The Taney Court: Justices, Rulings, and Legacy. Santa Barbara, Calif.: ABC-CLIO, 2003.

 Johnson III, Ludwell H. "Abraham Lincoln and the Development of Presidential War-Making Powers: Prize Cases (1863) Revisited." Civil War History 35.3 (1989): 208-224. excerpt
 Konig, David Thomas, Paul Finkelman, and Christopher Alan Bracey, eds. The Dred Scott Case: Historical and Contemporary Perspectives on Race and Law (Ohio University Press, 2010).

 Maltz, Earl M. Dred Scott and the Politics of Slavery. Lawrence, Kans.: University Press of Kansas, 2007.
 Streichler, Stuart A. "Grier, Robert Cooper." American National Biography Online. Accessed November 6, 2015. http://www.anb.org/articles/11/11-00357-print.html.
 Vishneski III, John S. "What the court decided in Dred Scott v. Sandford." American Journal of Legal History 32 (1988): 373+.

External links
  Biography-West Laurel Hill Cemetery web site

1794 births
1870 deaths
19th-century American judges
19th-century American politicians
American Presbyterians
Burials at West Laurel Hill Cemetery
Burials in Pennsylvania
Dickinson College alumni
Pennsylvania Democrats
Pennsylvania Jacksonians
Pennsylvania lawyers
Pennsylvania state court judges
People from Cumberland County, Pennsylvania
United States federal judges appointed by James K. Polk
Justices of the Supreme Court of the United States
United States federal judges admitted to the practice of law by reading law